Aumont may refer to:

People
 House of Aumont, a French noble house
 Jacques Aumont (born 1942), French academic and writer
 Jean-Pierre Aumont (1911–2001), French actor
 Michel Aumont (1936–2019), French actor
 Phillippe Aumont (born 1989), Canadian baseball player
 Tina Aumont (1946–2006), French-American actress

Places

France
 Aumont, Jura
 Aumont, Somme
 Aumont-Aubrac, Lozère
 Aumont-en-Halatte, Oise
 Isle-Aumont, Aube
 Villequier-Aumont, Aisne

Switzerland
 Aumont, Fribourg, a former municipality of the Canton of Fribourg